Satipo is a town in central Peru, in Satipo District, Satipo Province in Junín Region. It is the capital of Satipo Province.

Demographics
Satipo has an estimated 30,000 inhabitants as of 2016.

History
In 1947, an earthquake devastated the town and killed 2,333 people.

References

External links
  Municipal website
 http://www.nzz.ch/wirtschaft/wirtschaftspolitik/suedamerikas-neue-rolle-im-drogenhandel-1.18626835?reduced=true

Populated places in the Junín Region